"Raindrops Keep Fallin' on My Head" is a song written by Burt Bacharach and Hal David for the 1969 film Butch Cassidy and the Sundance Kid. The uplifting lyrics describe somebody who overcomes his troubles and worries by realizing that "it won't be long till happiness steps up to greet me."

The single by B. J. Thomas reached No. 1 on charts in the United States, Canada and Norway, and reached No. 38 in the UK Singles Chart. It topped the Billboard Hot 100 for four weeks in January 1970 and was also the first American No. 1 hit of the 1970s. The song also spent seven weeks atop the Billboard adult contemporary chart. Billboard ranked it as the No. 4 song of 1970. According to Billboard magazine, it had sold over 2 million copies by March 14, 1970, with eight-track and cassette versions also climbing the charts. It won an Oscar for Best Original Song. Bacharach also won Best Original Score.

History

Composition and recording
The song was recorded by B. J. Thomas in seven takes, after Bacharach expressed dissatisfaction with the first six. In the film version of the song, Thomas had been recovering from laryngitis, which made his voice sound huskier than in the 7-inch release. The film version featured a separate vaudeville-style instrumental break in double time while Paul Newman performed bicycle stunts.

Ray Stevens was first offered the opportunity to record it for the film, but turned it down. He chose instead to record the song "Sunday Morning Coming Down", written by Kris Kristofferson. Bob Dylan is supposed to have been approached for the song, but he reportedly declined too.  Carol Kaye played electric bass on the song.

Some felt the song was the wrong tone for a western film like Butch Cassidy and the Sundance Kid, but director George Roy Hill insisted on its inclusion. Robert Redford, one of the stars of the films, was among those who disapproved of using the song, though he later acknowledged he was wrong:

Legacy

The song was featured during the 2004 superhero film Spider-Man 2 over a montage sequence when Peter Parker (Tobey Maguire) initially renounces his identity as Spider-Man. The same year, it finished at number 23 on AFI's 100 Years...100 Songs survey of top tunes in American cinema. In 2008, the single was ranked 85th on Billboards Hot 100 All-Time Top Songs and placed 95th in the 55th Anniversary edition of the All-Time Hot 100 list in 2013. Billboard Magazine also ranked the song 15th on its Top 50 Movie Songs of All Time list in 2014. 
 

On December 3, 2013, the National Academy of Recording Arts and Sciences announced that the single would be inducted into the 2014 Grammy Hall Of Fame.

Chart performance

Weekly singles chartsB. J. Thomas versionJohnny Farnham version'''

Year-end charts

All-time charts

Certifications and sales

Media mentions
 It was mentioned in a candidate's name in the Monty Python's Flying Circus Election Night Special sketch in the "It's A Living" episode in 1970.

Cover versions
== Johnny Hartman (with Ken Ascher-piano, Jimmy Heath-st, Alex Gafa-g, Earl May-cb.
 In 1970, Barbara Mason's cover reached U.S. number 112 and R&B number 38.
 In 1970, from January 24 to March 13, it was the number-one hit (for seven weeks) in Australia on the Go-Set National Top 40 for Johnny Farnham.
 In 1970, Bobbie Gentry's version, from her album Fancy, reached number 40 in the UK chart.
 In 1970, it was covered in French by French singer Sacha Distel as ”Toute La Pluie Tombe Sur Moi”, while his English-language version was a number 10 hit in the UK Singles Chart, and number 13 in Ireland; the French version reaching number 10 in his home country. Distel also recorded a version in Italian, ”Gocce Di Pioggia Su Di Me”.
 In 1970, Portuguese-born television and radio presenter Pedro Biker released a Danish version re-entitled "Regndråber Drypper I Mit Hår".
 In 1970, it was covered in Swedish by Swedish singer Siw Malmkvist as "Regnet det bara öser ner" (The rain just pours down). It peaked at #5 in the Swedish best selling chart "Kvällstoppen".
 In 1970, the song was covered by:
 Peggy Lee on her album Bridge Over Troubled Water, released by Capitol Records.
 Patty Pravo records a cover of the song, inserted in the 1970 album of the same name, (RCA Italiana- LP8S 21102), with an Italian text by Cristiano Minellono, entitled Gocce di pioggia su di me (Raindrops on me).
 In 1973, the Barry Sisters covered the song in a Yiddish version ("Trop'ns Fin Regen Oif Mein Kop") on their album Our Way.
 The 1995 cover version by Welsh rock band Manic Street Preachers is credited with adding greater nuance to the song, the Financial Times citing their recording as transforming the song from carefree optimism to "an exhortation to keep going in the face of tragedy", and noting that Bradfield's voice "added grit to the facile lyric". The group often spent their downtime on the tour bus watching the film Butch Cassidy and the Sundance Kid, and incorporated the song into live sets. After the disappearance of lyricist Richey Edwards, the band decided to continue rather than split up. Having booked studio time in France to record their fourth album, Everything Must Go (1996), they were invited to record for the War Child charity album The Help Album (1995). The project required all songs to be recorded in one day. While band biographer Simon Price has described the recording and release of the record as a "coded message" that the band still existed, Bradfield recalls the events differently: "...us putting it out wasn't planned as us saying 'We're OK, guys!', but the deadline was the next day after we'd arrived in this place, for some kind of new beginning." The band's recorded version of the song contains the first recorded instance of drummer Sean Moore performing on trumpet, and also appears on their 2003 B-sides and rarities compilation album Lipstick Traces (A Secret History of Manic Street Preachers). The Manics further reference the film Butch Cassidy and the Sundance Kid'' with the B-side "Sepia".
 Lisa Miskovsky covered the song in the extended version of her self-titled (2004) album.

See also

List of number-one singles in Australia during the 1970s
List of RPM number-one singles of 1970
List of number-one hits of 1970 (Mexico)
List of number-one hits in Norway
List of number-one adult contemporary singles of 1969 (U.S.)
List of number-one adult contemporary singles of 1970 (U.S.)
List of Hot 100 number-one singles of 1970 (U.S.)

References

External links
 

Songs about depression
Songs about weather
1969 singles
1970 singles
Songs with lyrics by Hal David
Songs with music by Burt Bacharach
B. J. Thomas songs
John Farnham songs
Nancy Wilson (jazz singer) songs
Bobbie Gentry songs
Andy Williams songs
Barbara Mason songs
Barry Manilow songs
Billboard Hot 100 number-one singles
Cashbox number-one singles
RPM Top Singles number-one singles
Number-one singles in Australia
Number-one singles in Norway
Best Original Song Academy Award-winning songs
Grammy Hall of Fame Award recipients
1969 songs
1960s ballads
Number-one singles in Mexico
Scepter Records singles
Songs written for films